Bessborough may refer to:

Peerage
Earl of Bessborough, a title in the Peerage of Ireland

Places
Bessborough Armoury, a Canadian Forces armoury in Vancouver, British Columbia
Bessborough House, the family seat of the Ponsonby dynasty, Earls of Bessborough, in County Kilkenny, Ireland
Bessborough Mother & Baby Home, an institution in County Cork, Ireland, 1922–1998
Bessborough Reservoir, south of the River Thames in Surrey, England
Bessborough School, Moncton, New Brunswick, Canada
Delta Bessborough, a hotel in downtown Saskatoon, Saskatchewan, Canada
Bessboro, the founding name of Westport, New York, United States

People
Brabazon Ponsonby, 1st Earl of Bessborough (1679–1758), British politician and peer
William Ponsonby, 2nd Earl of Bessborough PC PC (I) (1704–1793), Irish and English peer and member of the House of Lords
Frederick Ponsonby, 3rd Earl of Bessborough (1758–1844), British peer
Henrietta Ponsonby, Countess of Bessborough (1761–1821), wife of Frederick Ponsonby, 3rd Earl of Bessborough and mother of the notorious Lady Caroline Lamb
John Ponsonby, 4th Earl of Bessborough PC (1781–1847), British Whig politician
John Ponsonby, 5th Earl of Bessborough, PC (1809–1880), British cricketer and politician
Frederick Ponsonby, 6th Earl of Bessborough (1815–1895), British peer and cricketer
Walter Ponsonby, 7th Earl of Bessborough (1821–1906), British peer and member of the House of Lords
Edward Ponsonby, 8th Earl of Bessborough, KP, CB, CVO (1851–1920), British peer
Vere Ponsonby, 9th Earl of Bessborough PC GCMG (1880–1956), British businessman and politician who served as Governor General of Canada
Roberte Ponsonby, Countess of Bessborough (born 1892), wife of Vere Ponsonby 9th Earl of Bessborough, Viscount Duncannon.
Frederick Ponsonby, 10th Earl of Bessborough (1913–1993), British diplomat, businessman, playwright, Conservative politician, and peer
Arthur Ponsonby, 11th Earl of Bessborough (1912–2002), British peer